Egypt Defense Expo or EDEX is the first international defense exhibition in Egypt, covering air, land, and sea military technologies. The exhibition is held every two years at the Egypt International Exhibition Center in the city of New Cairo. The exhibition is organized by Clarion Events Defense and Security in co-operation with the Egyptian Armed Forces and Ministry of Military Production. EDEX aims to bring together key defense and security players from the region and across the world.

Announcement

During a press conference in Cairo in December 2017, the Egyptian Armed Forces announced that Egypt would host a major international defense exhibition in 2018 under the patronage of President Abdel Fattah El Sisi, the President of the Arab Republic of Egypt and the Supreme Commander of the Egyptian Armed Forces, under the name of Egypt Defense Expo (EDEX).

Venue

The event takes place at the new Egypt International Exhibition Center. The exhibition center was established in New Cairo by the Armed Forces in October 2017. It is considered the largest international exhibition center in Egypt.

EDEX 2018
Egypt Defense Expo 2018 was held between 3–5 December, 2018. Over 350 international defense and security manufacturers from over 40 countries took part as exhibitors, and over 30,000 visitors attended the exhibition across three days. The exhibition featured a fully hosted international military VIP Delegation Program.

EDEX 2021
The second edition was postponed and will be held between 29 November - 2 December 2021 at the Egypt International Exhibition Centre (EIEC) in New Cairo with over 400 exhibitors and 30,000 visitors expected to attend the show.

References

Trade fairs in Egypt
Arms fairs
Military industry
Events in Egypt
Exhibitions